The Georgians may refer to:

 The Georgians (American band), a jazz and dance group formed in 1921 under Frank 
The Georgians (British band), a jazz band founded in 1934 by Nat Gonella
The Georgians, a 1904 book by William Harben

See also 
 Georgians, a nation and ethnic group who constitute a majority of the population in Georgia